Inter Nos is a 1982 Icelandic drama film directed by Hrafn Gunnlaugsson. It was selected as the Icelandic entry for the Best Foreign Language Film at the 55th Academy Awards, but was not accepted as a nominee.
Einar Örn Benediktsson's dad, Benedikt Árnason plays the main role.

Cast
 Benedikt Árnason
 Andrea Oddsteinsdóttir
 Júlíus Hjörleifsson
 Margrét Gunnlaugsdóttir
 Maria Ellingsen
 Sirry Steffen
 Valgarður Guðjónsson
 Þorvaldur S. Þorvaldsson

See also
 List of submissions to the 55th Academy Awards for Best Foreign Language Film
 List of Icelandic submissions for the Academy Award for Best Foreign Language Film

References

External links
 

1982 films
1982 drama films
Films directed by Hrafn Gunnlaugsson
1980s Icelandic-language films
Icelandic drama films